SM U-79 was one of the 329 submarines serving in the Imperial German Navy (Imperial German Navy) in World War I. U-79 was engaged in the combat in the First Battle of the Atlantic.

After the war she was transferred to the French Navy, in which she served as Victor Réveille.

Imperial German Navy 
SM U-79 was commissioned by Kaptlt. Jess, who was replaced by Kaptlt. Rohrbeck in January 1917. Rohrbeck would be replaced by Kaptlt. Stevogt. U-79 came off the stocks at Hamburg (Vulcan) in 1916, and joined the Kiel School, where she is known to have been in July, and left Kiel for Wilhelmshaven about the end of July to join the 1st Half Flotilla.

Between 6 and 26 August 1916, she laid 34 mines off the south coast of Ireland. She fired on a special service vessel north-west of Ireland on the night of 19 August; the torpedo missed. In the period 26 September to 14 October 1916, she laid mines in the Firth of Clyde.

Patrolling off Portugal, via the English Channel, between 21 December 1916 and 28 January 1917, she sank eight steamers and one sailing ship, as well as capturing the Norwegian steamer Nanna on 24 January. On her return journey, by way of the Irish Channel, U-79 compelled Nanna to take her under tow to the Danish coast, likely as a result of engine damage she reported 26 January.

On 1 April 1917, she departed to lay mines in Inishtrahull Sound, but could not complete her task due to engine trouble, and returned on 21 April. She departed for a repeat of this mission 1 January 1918, but was forced to return 5 January due to compass trouble.

She carried out training off Augustenhof Lighthouse, in the Baltic Sea, from 5 to 9 February, before departing on her next patrol, to lay mines off the Netherlands, returning 19 February, again avoiding Heligoland.

British Naval Intelligence (better known as Room 40) records her at Norderney on 2 May 1918, and possibly in the Elbe on 9 November. On 21 November 1918, she was surrendered at Harwich.

Summary of raiding history

French Navy
U-79 was surrendered to the Allies at Harwich on 21 November 1918 in accordance with the requirements of the Armistice with Germany. She was transferred to France and commissioned as Victor Réveille in 1922. On 23 November 1923, she ran aground at Boulogne, Pas de Calais, France. She was refloated, repaired, and returned to service.

Reduced to reserve in 1930, the boat was stricken on 27 July 1935, condemned two days later, and sold to L'Hermitte (Brest) for FF 70,642 on 6 August 1936, to be broken up.

See also 
Room 40

References

Notes

Citations

Bibliography

External links
Photos of cruises of German submarine U-54 in 1916-1918.
A 44 min. German film from 1917 about a cruise of the German submarine U-35.

Room 40:  original documents, photos and maps about World War I German submarine warfare and British Room 40 Intelligence from The National Archives, Kew, Richmond, UK.

World War I submarines of Germany
U-boats commissioned in 1916
1915 ships
Ships built in Kiel
German Type UE I submarines
Foreign submarines in French service
Maritime incidents in 1923